Erin Murphy is an American poet who is credited with inventing the demi-sonnet. She received her B.A. in English and Philosophy from Washington College, and an M.F.A. in Poetry from the University of Massachusetts, Amherst's MFA Program for Poets & Writers (MFA Fellowship recipient). Murphy is Professor of English and Creative Writing faculty at The Pennsylvania State University, Altoona College.

Publications

Books
 Dislocation and Other Theories (Word Press, 2008)
 Science of Desire (Word Press, 2004), a finalist for the Paterson Poetry Prize.
 Too Much of this World (Mammoth Books, 2008), winner of the Anthony Piccione Poetry Prize.
 Making Poems: Forty Poems with Commentary by the Poets (State University of New York Press, 2010)
 Word Problems (Word Press, 2011)
 Distant Glitter (Word Poetry, 2013)
 Ancilla (Lamar University Press, 2014)
 Assisted Living (Brick Road Poetry Press, 2018), winner of the Brick Road Poetry Prize

Other
Murphy's poems have appeared in journals and anthologies such as The Georgia Review, The Southern Humanities Review, Women's Studies Quarterly, Field, Nimrod, Subtropics, The Paterson Literary Review, Literal Latte, Mississippi Review, Green Mountains Review, Kalliope and 180 More Extraordinary Poems for Every Day, edited by Billy Collins (Random House, 2005).

Other awards
Murphy's other awards include the National Writers Union Poetry Award (judged by Donald Hall), the Normal School Poetry Prize judged by Nick Flynn, a $5,000 Dorothy Sargent Rosenberg Poetry Award, numerous Pushcart Prize nominations, the Foley Poetry Award, University of Massachusetts M.F.A. Poetry Fellowship, a Maryland State Arts Council Individual Artist Award, and an Individual Creative Artist Fellowship from the Pennsylvania Council on the Arts.

Murphy was inducted into the Blair County Arts Hall of Fame on October 8, 2015.

References

External links
 —personal website
 Erin Murphy/Distant Glitter at Word Poetry Books
 Erin Murphy/Word Problems at Word Poetry Books
 Erin Murphy/Making Poems at SUNY Press
 Erin Murphy/Dislocation and Other Theories at Word Poetry Books
 Erin Murphy/Science of Desire at Word Poetry Books
 Review of Science of Desire in The Georgia Review; see "Book Briefs"
 Erin Murphy at America Magazine
 Review of Distant Glitter in The Summerset Review
 "Dear Fringe" on Verse Daily
 "Dear Winged" on Verse Daily

21st-century American poets
Living people
American women poets
University of Massachusetts Amherst MFA Program for Poets & Writers alumni
21st-century American women writers
Year of birth missing (living people)
Washington College alumni